Ruggero Pertile (born 8 August 1974 in Camposampiero) is  an Italian long-distance runner who specialises in marathon running. He was the winner of the 2004 Rome City Marathon and has represented Italy internationally at three World Championships in Athletics and two Olympic Games.

Biography
He was fourth in the marathon at the 2010 European Athletics Championships, missing out on the podium after struggling with cramping in the final stages of the race. He took a surprise victory at the 2010 Turin Marathon, completing the race in a time of 2:10:58 in rainy conditions. The following year he competed at the Milano City Marathon and overhauled Daniel Too in the final stages to claim second place on the podium.

Achievements

See also
 Italian all-time lists – Marathon

References

External links
 

1974 births
Living people
Italian male long-distance runners
Italian male marathon runners
Athletes (track and field) at the 2008 Summer Olympics
Athletes (track and field) at the 2012 Summer Olympics
Olympic athletes of Italy
People from Camposampiero
World Athletics Championships athletes for Italy
Mediterranean Games silver medalists for Italy
Athletes (track and field) at the 2013 Mediterranean Games
Mediterranean Games medalists in athletics
Sportspeople from the Province of Padua